Sunshine Ukulele is a 2017 feature film from Irish director Graham Jones about a young Irish boy who receives the gift of a ukulele from his uncle and proceeds upon a comic, suburban, mini-odyssey in which he struggles to properly identify with the nineteenth century instrument.

References

2017 films
Irish musical films
2010s musical films